Chak Rud (also Romanized as Chāk Rūd) is a village in Pir Kuh Rural District, Deylaman District, Siahkal County, Gilan Province, Iran. At the 2006 census, its population was 33, in 8 families.

References 

Populated places in Siahkal County